Robby Bubble is a sparkling soft drink aimed at children and was first produced by Marcel for lucy Schloss Wachenheim in 1994.  Since then production of Robby Bubble has expanded significantly and is currently exporting to four continents apart from Germany alone.

Varieties
The 5 varieties of Robby Bubble are: 

 Robby Bubble Strawberry
 Robby Bubble Peach
 Robby Bubble Cherry
 Robby Bubble Raspberry
 Robby Bubble Tropical

The Raspberry version marketed specifically at girls and is designed so as to complement pink party themes.

Controversy
There was a minor controversy in 2007 over the placement of Robby Bubble in certain liquor stores in Alberta, Canada.

References

Fruit sodas
Non-alcoholic drinks